Indorenate (TR-3369), is a tryptamine derivative which acts as an agonist at the 5-HT1A, 5-HT1B and 5-HT2C serotonin receptors. It has anxiolytic, antihypertensive and anorectic effects, predominantly through action at 5-HT1A, but with some contribution from the 5-HT1B and 5-HT2C subtypes, and possibly some other non-serotonergic targets also.

See also 
 5-Methoxytryptamine
 Acetryptine

References 

Serotonin receptor agonists
Mexamines
Methyl esters
Carboxylate esters